Brian Patten (born 7 February 1946) is an English poet and author.  He came to prominence in the 1960s as one of the Liverpool poets, and writes primarily lyrical poetry about human relationships. His famous works include "Little Johnny's Confessions", "The Irrelevant Song", "Vanishing Trick", "Emma's Doll", and "Impossible Parents".

Career
Patten was born in Bootle, Liverpool, England. He attended Sefton Park School in the Smithdown Road area of Liverpool, where his early poetic writing was encouraged. He left school at fifteen and began work for The Bootle Times writing a column on popular music.

Together with the other two Liverpool poets, Roger McGough and Adrian Henri, Patten published The Mersey Sound in 1967.  One of the best-selling poetry anthologies of modern times, The Mersey Sound aimed to make poetry accessible to a broader audience.  It has been described as the most significant anthology of the twentieth century.  Together with Henri and McGough, Patten was awarded the Freedom of the City of Liverpool in 2001.

Patten's first published volumes of poems were Little Johnny's Confession (1967) and Notes to the Hurrying Man (1969).  They were followed by The Irrelevant Song (1971), Vanishing Trick (1976) and  Grave Gossip (1979).  In 1983, along with Roger McGough and Adrian Henri, Patten published the follow-up to The Mersey Sound  with New Volume. Patten's later solo collections Storm Damage (1988) and Armada (1996) are more varied, the latter featuring a sequence of poems concerning the death of his mother and memories of his childhood. Armada is perhaps Patten's most mature and formal book, dispensing with much of the playfulness of former work. He has also written comic verse for children, notably Gargling With Jelly and Thawing Frozen Frogs.

Patten's style is generally lyrical and his subjects are primarily love and relationships. His 1986 collection Love Poems draws together his best work in this area from the previous sixteen years.  Charles Causley commented that he "reveals a sensibility profoundly aware of the ever-present possibility of the magical and the miraculous, as well as of the granite-hard realities. These are undiluted poems, beautifully calculated, informed - even in their darkest moments - with courage and hope."

The actor Paul Bettany in his contribution to the poetry collection Poems That Make Grown Men Cry (2014) said this of Brian Patten's work:  Reading Brian Patten's poetry does that trick that art should do, which is to sort of adhere you to the surface of the planet, just long enough that you don't go spinning off into the loneliness of space - 'Somebody else has felt this too', you think. And you breathe a little easier.

Patten's poem So Many Different Lengths of Time has in recent times, become a popular poem recited at funerals. At the service to remember Ken Dodd in Liverpool's Anglican Cathedral, the actor Stephanie Cole read So Many Different Lengths of Time to a congregation of thousands within and outside the building. Opening his poem with verse by Pablo Neruda, Patten's poem argues that it is the act of remembrance which offers family members the best antidote to the anguish of loss. In tackling the subject of grief, Patten views poetry as performing an important social function: ‘Poetry helps us understand what we’ve forgotten to remember. It reminds us of things that are important to us when the world overtakes us emotionally.’

Selected bibliography

Publications with others
 The Mersey Sound  1967
 New Volume  1983

Poetry collections for adults
 Little Johnny's Confession  1967
 Notes to the Hurrying Man  1969
 When You Wake Tomorrow illustrated by Pip Benveniste 1971
 The Irrelevant Song  1971
 And Sometimes It Happens 1972
 Vanishing Trick  1976
 Grave Gossip  1979
 Love Poems  - (anthology)  1986
 Storm Damage  1988
 Grinning Jack (anthology)  1992
 Armada  1996
 Selected Poems  (anthology)  2007
 Collected Love Poems  (anthology)  2007
 The Book of Upside Down Thinking  2018

Books for children
 The Elephant and the Flower 1970
 Jumping Mouse 1972
 Emma's Doll 1976
 Mr Moon's Last Case  1988
 Thawing Frozen Frogs 1992
 Impossible Parents, illustrated by Arthur Robins Walker Books, 1994, 
 Jimmy Tag-Along 1995
 The Blue and Green Ark: An Alphabet For Planet Earth 1999
 Juggling With Gerbils 2000
 The Impossible Parents Go Green, illus. Robins, Walker Books, 2001
 The Story Giant 2004
 The Most Impossible Parents, illus. Robins, Walker Books, 2010
 Gargling With Jelly 2015

As editor
 The Puffin Book of Utterly Brilliant Poetry 1998
 The Puffin Book of Modern Children's Verse 2006

References

External links
 
 
 An interview from Liverpool's Nerve magazine
 Interview with Roger McGough about 40 years of the Mersey Poets
 Articles by Brian Patten on the 5th Estate blog
 Portraits of Brian Patten at National Portrait Gallery 
 

Fellows of the Royal Society of Literature
1950 births
Living people
20th-century English poets
21st-century English poets
English male poets
20th-century English male writers
Grimms members
Audiobook narrators